Esmé Augusta Bianco (born 25 May 1982) is a British actress and neo-burlesque performer, who is best known for her recurring roles as Ros on Game of Thrones and Jane Chatwin on The Magicians.

Career
Bianco has posed for painters Christian Furr and Peregrine Heathcote.

Bianco's feature films parts include Burlesque Fairytales, in which she played "Mother" in one of the tales. She also appeared in Chemical Wedding, Dead Man Running, and The Scorpion King 4: Quest for Power. Bianco appeared as the character Ros, a prostitute in King's Landing, in the HBO series Game of Thrones. She first appeared in the series premiere "Winter Is Coming", returning for 13 more episodes, often in the show's "sexposition" scenes, before her character is murdered in the season 3 episode "The Climb".

In 2020, Bianco made an appearance on the Puscifer album Existential Reckoning on the song "UPGrade".

Personal life
In February 2021, Bianco accused musician Marilyn Manson of physically abusing her during their relationship in 2011, after she had split from her husband. In April 2021, Bianco sued Manson for sexual assault, human trafficking, and abuse. Bianco alleged that she was given drugs and alcohol, and also subjected to threats of violence and rape. Bianco also alleged that Manson tied her to a prayer kneeler, beat her with a whip, and raped her. Marilyn Manson responded to Bianco through his attorney, stating that Bianco's allegations were "provably false". They reached an out-of-court settlement in January 2023, with the terms of agreement not disclosed.

Filmography

Film

Television

References

External links

 

1982 births
Living people
Actors from St Albans
Actresses from Hertfordshire
Actresses from London
British neo-burlesque performers
English female models
English film actresses
English people of Italian descent
English television actresses
English voice actresses
21st-century English actresses